Seymour Narrows is a  section of the Discovery Passage in British Columbia known for strong tidal currents. Discovery Passage lies between Vancouver Island at Menzies Bay, British Columbia and Quadra Island except at its northern end where the eastern shoreline is Sonora Island. Through this narrow channel, currents can reach .

Etymology
The narrows were named for Rear Admiral Sir George Francis Seymour who commanded the Pacific Station from 1844 to 1848. Seymour Narrows was described by Captain George Vancouver as "one of the vilest stretches of water in the world." Even after Ripple Rock was removed, it remains a challenging route. In March 1981, the freighter Star Philippine ran aground in the narrows.

Hydrology
Turbulence develops usually around a Reynolds number of 2000, depending on the geometric structure of the channel.

Seymour Narrows delineates part of the northern extent of the Salish Sea.

Ripple Rock

Ripple Rock was a submerged twin-peak mountain that lay just nine feet beneath the surface of Seymour Narrows.  It was a serious hazard to shipping, sinking 119 vessels and taking 114 lives. The gunboat USS Saranac was one of the rock's first recorded victims. On April 5, 1958, after twenty-seven months of tunneling and engineering work, Ripple Rock was blown up with 1,375 tons of Nitramex 2H explosive making it the largest commercial, non-nuclear blast in North America. The Halifax Explosion in 1917 was larger but it was not a deliberate act.

The event was broadcast live on Canadian television. The footage is also regularly screened at the Campbell River Museum.

Vancouver band The Evaporators wrote a song about the event and released it on their 2004 album Ripple Rock.

References

Canadian Tide and Current Tables, Vol. 6, 2003

External links
 Overview of Seymour Narrows Archived from the original on 2012-02-05
 Ripple Rock Explosion, Vancouver Island
 Ripple Rock blown up – Unforgettable Moments – CBC Archives (Video) 
 Campbell River Museum official website
 Ripple Rock page
 Navigating Seymour Narrows
 Freighter Aground in Canada, in the New York Times, March 18, 1981

Central Coast of British Columbia
Landforms of the Discovery Islands
Straits of British Columbia